Roberto Tobe Belope (born 14 July 1984), simply known as Tobe, is a Spanish-born Equatoguinean futsal player who plays as a defender for Italian club Signor Prestito and the Equatorial Guinea national futsal team, where he serves as its captain.

External links
LNFS profile

Roberto Tobe profile on Sólo Fútbol Sala

1984 births
Living people
Citizens of Equatorial Guinea through descent
Equatoguinean men's futsal players
Futsal defenders
Baku United FC players
Equatoguinean expatriate sportspeople in England
Equatoguinean expatriate sportspeople in Italy
Equatoguinean expatriate sportspeople in Vietnam
Bubi people
Spanish men's futsal players
Footballers from Madrid
Caja Segovia FS players
Inter FS players
Spanish expatriate sportspeople in England
Spanish expatriate sportspeople in Italy
Spanish expatriate sportspeople in Vietnam
Spanish sportspeople of Equatoguinean descent
Spanish people of Bubi descent